The 2015 Houston Cougars football team represented the University of Houston in the 2015 NCAA Division I FBS football season.  It was the 68th year of season play for Houston. The team was led by first-year head coach Tom Herman and played its home games at TDECU Stadium in Houston. The Houston Cougars football team is a member of the American Athletic Conference in its West Division. They finished the season 13–1, 7–1 in American Athletic play to win a share of the West Division title. Due to their head-to-head win over Navy, they represented the West Division in the inaugural American Athletic Championship Game where they defeated Temple to become American Athletic Conference champions. As the highest ranked team from the "Group of five", they received an automatic bid to a New Year's Six bowl. They were invited to the Peach Bowl where they defeated Florida State.

Schedule

Schedule Source:

Game summaries

Tennessee Tech

at Louisville

Texas State

at Tulsa

SMU

at Tulane

at UCF

Vanderbilt

Cincinnati

Memphis

at UConn

Navy

Temple (The American Championship)

vs. Florida State (Peach Bowl)

Rankings

References

Houston
Houston Cougars football seasons
American Athletic Conference football champion seasons
Peach Bowl champion seasons
Houston Cougars football